Gilbert Bischoff (born 29 September 1951) is a Swiss former cyclist. He competed in the team time trial at the 1972 Summer Olympics.

References

External links
 

1951 births
Living people
Swiss male cyclists
Olympic cyclists of Switzerland
Cyclists at the 1972 Summer Olympics
People from Sion District
Sportspeople from Valais